Norman Polmar is a prominent author specializing in the naval, aviation, and intelligence areas.

He has led major projects for the U.S. Department of Defense and the U.S. Navy, and foreign governments. His professional expertise has served three Secretaries of the U.S. Navy and two Chiefs of Naval Operations. He is credited with 50 published books, including nine previous editions of Ships and Aircraft of the U.S. Fleet and four editions of Guide to the Soviet Navy.  Polmar writes a column for  Proceedings  and was editor of the United States and several other sections of the annual publications of Jane's Fighting Ships.

In 2019, the Naval Historical Foundation awarded Polmar the Commodore Dudley W. Knox Naval History Lifetime Achievement Award.

References

External links

American naval historians
20th-century American non-fiction writers
Living people
Year of birth missing (living people)
20th-century American male writers
American male non-fiction writers